Sahel FC is a Cameroonian football club based in Maroua. They are a member of the Cameroonian Football Federation.  The club was relegated from the Cameroon Premiere Division in 2007.

Football clubs in Cameroon
Sports clubs in Cameroon